Miki Ishii (石井美樹, born 7 November 1989) is a Japanese beach volleyball player. She competed in the 2020 Summer Olympics.

References

External links
 
 
 

1989 births
Living people
People from Fujisawa, Kanagawa
Japanese beach volleyball players
Olympic beach volleyball players of Japan
Beach volleyball players at the 2020 Summer Olympics
Asian Games medalists in beach volleyball
Beach volleyball players at the 2018 Asian Games
Medalists at the 2018 Asian Games
Asian Games silver medalists for Japan